"Night Is Fallin' in My Heart" is a song written by Dennis Linde. The song was first recorded by country music artist J.P. Pennington for his 1991 album, Whatever It Takes. It was later recorded and released as a single in October 1994 by American country music group Diamond Rio. It was the second single released from their third album, Love a Little Stronger. It peaked at No. 9 in the United States, and No. 6 in Canada.

Chart performance

Year-end charts

References

1994 singles
1991 songs
Diamond Rio songs
Songs written by Dennis Linde
Arista Nashville singles